West Torrens is a Baseball club playing in the South Australian Baseball League. Known as the Eagles, their home ground is Lockleys Oval in Lockleys.

Club history 

The West Torrens Baseball Club was founded in 1918 when several members of the Freemasons Ramblers Baseball Club combined with players from the Underdale area to enter a team to represent West Torrens in the 1919 district baseball competition. The team finished second in its first season and won the "A" grade premiership the following year.

The club's first ground was in the parklands on the north side of Henley Beach Road and on the city (east) side of Blakewell Bridge. Several parkland sites were used as home grounds over the next few years and at one stage even the current Richmond Oval site was used as a home base.

During 1959 the club built its first "Home-Base" on the eastern boundary of Lockleys Oval. Due to increasing membership and the requirement for improved facilities, it became necessary to re-build. The present building, "Eagle Park", resulted from countless hours of work by a select band of dedicated members during 1971/72 season. It has since had additional rooms and facilities added.

Australian representatives

P. Brideoake - 1946-1949
B. Dooland - 1947
C. Payne - 1951 & 1956*
D. Vaughton - 1951 & 1954
G. Hole - 1952
J. Tamlin - 1955
M. Puckett - 1956*, 1957, 1961, 1964
K. Wellington - 1957, 1959–1961, 1964
F. Medley - 1960
R. Shirt - 1966, 1968
G. Thompson - 1967-1971
L. Buller - 1968-1970
R. Brown - 1972
D. Forbes - 1973-1974
B. Cakebread - 1982
T. Day - 1983
G. Puckett - 1983
M. Gregg - 1988*, 1990–1992
A. Scott - 1990–1991, 1993–1998
B. Weber - 1990
D. Kirwin - 1992-1993
M. Dunn - 1994
D. Richter - 2010

* Denotes Olympic Games

See also
South Australian Baseball League 2006/2007

External links
 West Torrens Baseball Club

Australian baseball clubs
Sporting clubs in Adelaide
Baseball teams established in 1918
1918 establishments in Australia